Suraksan is a mountain in South Korea. It extends across the district of Nowon-gu in Seoul, the national capital, and the cities of Namyangju and Uijeongbu, in the province of Gyeonggi-do.

Sights
Suraksan is a hiking mountain, notable sights include the Geunnyu, Eunnyu, and Ongnyu waterfalls, the Heungguksa temple from the Silla period, the Seongnimsa temple from the Joseon period, and Gwesanjeong Pavilion.

See also
 List of mountains in Seoul
 List of mountains in Korea

Notes

References
 

Mountains of Seoul
Mountains of Gyeonggi Province